"Judgement Day" is a story of British science fiction character Judge Dredd. It was first published with alternating episodes in both 2000 AD and the Judge Dredd Megazine in 1992. It was the first crossover between the two publications; three more have since followed. It was also a crossover with another 2000 AD series, Strontium Dog, as it featured the second occasion on which Judge Dredd confronted Johnny Alpha (the lead character in Strontium Dog). It was written by Garth Ennis (based on an idea by John Wagner) and illustrated by Carlos Ezquerra, Peter Doherty, Dean Ormston and Chris Halls.

Set mainly in 2114 it tells of how the Fourth World War took the lives of three billion people when a powerful necromagus called Sabbat raised all the corpses in the world as zombies. The series is mainly notable because it was Ennis' longest Dredd story, it killed off most of the supporting cast of the Judge Dredd series, and it was the first story to feature Johnny Alpha since he was killed off at the end of the Strontium Dog series (from Alpha's point of view it was set two years before his death).

Plot

Prequel
Dredd and Alpha had previously met in "Top Dogs", published a year before, in which he and his partner-in-crime-fighting Wulf Sternhammer went back in time to Dredd's Mega-City One in order to capture two criminals wanted in their own time period. Dredd refused to accept them as law enforcers like himself and was determined to capture them, even after they managed to return to their own time from right under his very nose.

In the previous Dredd mega-epic, "Necropolis", 60 million citizens of Mega-City One were killed; with no way to dispose of them all with dignity, Chief Judge McGruder had them buried in vast pits outside the city.

Judgement Day
Judgement Day opens with Sabbat, in an unknown location underground, beginning to raise the dead. Judge Dredd is one of the first people to encounter the zombies while leading a group of cadets (including Cadet Giant), on a training mission in the Cursed Earth. Although Dredd leads the cadets back to the relative safety of Mega-City One, Judge Perrier (Dredd's main sidekick during Ennis' tenure on writing for the strip) is killed only yards from home.

On his arrival Dredd is informed that the dead are rising all over the world. Minor foreign Judges from earlier Dredd strips are shown protecting their respective cities - Judge Armour in Brit-Cit, Judge-Sergeant Joyce in Murphyville, Judge Bruce in Oz, etc. Mega-City One, due to Necropolis, finds itself facing the largest number of zombies: sixty million. Soon into the battle for Mega-City One, Dredd's protégé Judge Dekker is also killed and Dredd has to give the order to set fire to part of the cities' wall to hold back the zombies.

Meanwhile, in Hondo City (future Japan) bounty hunter Johnny Alpha arrives in pursuit of Sabbat, time-travelling from the year 2178. It later transpires that Sabbat is from Alpha's time and has already wiped out the entire population of another world, Bethsheba. Alpha has been sent to stop him. (It is never explained how the outbreak of a world war in 2114 does not seem to affect history in 2178.) However Alpha is apprehended by Judge Sadu (effectively Hondo's equivalent to Dredd), who assumes he is a criminal, and Alpha is forced to spend some considerable time proving his good intentions.

The Hondo authorities organise and host an international conference of chief judges from all over the world to decide how to deal with the zombie threat. It is attended by Dredd and Chief Judge McGruder, who leaves Judge Hershey in charge of the city in her absence. Alpha and Sadu also attend, Sadu by now being convinced that Alpha is on the level. Most of the foreign Judges Dredd met in earlier strips attend the conference too.

The conference is interrupted by the unexpected intrusion of Sabbat himself, who teleports in to warn the judges not to interfere with his plans, which are to kill everyone in the world and then use the army of zombies to conquer the Galaxy. Dredd shoots Sabbat in the head, apparently causing a mortal wound, but to no effect, as Sabbat simply removes the bullet and vanishes.

Reports come in that five mega-cities around the world have been overrun by the zombies, including Mega-City Two on North America's west coast (a city which Dredd had previously saved from destruction in "The Cursed Earth"). Dredd proposes that instead of allowing the cities' populations to serve as more undead soldiers for Sabbat, they should be annihilated with nuclear weapons, even though there may still be survivors trapped within them. Although horrified by the plan, the chief judges agree to carry it out, with the loss of two billion lives. (Another billion are lost in the cities which survive.)

Once scientists figure out where Sabbat is based, Dredd leads a suicide mission to assassinate him; all the previously-introduced foreign Judges are drafted, backed up by Hondo's Samurai battle armour. He bans Alpha from attending because he is a mutant and a wanted criminal in Mega-City One. Alpha proceeds to knock out Judge Joyce and take Joyce's place aboard Dredd's spaceship, his face concealed by a Samurai visor.

Dredd's team are forced to parachute from low orbit into Sabbat's lair, as Sabbat is using his powers to prevent all flying vehicles from working outside the mega-cities. They land in the radioactive Radlands of Ji (in post-nuclear China), where most of them are slaughtered. Judge Bruce dies in Alpha's arms; out of the twenty who started the mission, soon only Dredd, Alpha and Sadu are left, and are taken prisoner.

While Sabbat taunts his prisoners about his imminent victory, Sadu manages to escape and release Dredd and Alpha, but sacrifices his life in the process. After a lengthy fight, Dredd and Alpha eventually manage to decapitate Sabbat, and leave him helpless, powerless, but still alive (although a story published three months later reveals he has lost his mind and is reduced to a drooling vegetable). At the moment of Sabbat's defeat, his zombies instantly "switch off" and collapse all over the world at the eleventh hour.

In recognition of Alpha's help, Dredd recommends that he be pardoned for his earlier crimes. However they still face a long walk back to civilization through hundreds of miles of radioactive desert populated with hostile mutants and outlaws. Dredd is optimistic about their chances though, saying "Who the hell's gonna mess with us?"

Criticism
The format made no concessions to those who only bought one publication, as the story was entirely linear, with two episodes a fortnight in the weekly 2000 AD followed by a third episode in the (then) fortnightly Megazine. The editors attempted to address this problem in the next two crossovers, "Wilderlands" (1994) and "The Doomsday Scenario" (1999), by having two separate plot threads in each story, one in each comic, so that readers who only bought one could still follow the story.

This story  features some of the first published artwork from Chris Halls, an early pseudonym of the  director Chris Cunningham. The artwork in question was subject to much criticism regarding the similarity in style to Simon Bisley's work.

Garth Ennis himself has criticised his own story, saying that while "bits were okay... I recycled far too much material from other epics", particularly the Apocalypse War.

Aftermath in Judge Dredd
The Big Finish Productions audio play Judge Dredd: Pre-Emptive Revenge acts as an epilogue to "Judgement Day," taking place immediately afterward. Starring Toby Longworth as Dredd and Simon Pegg as Johnny Alpha, the story depicts their march together back to civilization. Despite constant bickering, the two come to respect each other a bit more as they wind up protecting each other during their journey. They discover a Sino-Cit nuclear silo activating a pre-programmed retaliatory assault on Hondo City as a result of Sino-Cit's destruction. Dredd and Alpha work together to prevent this, with Alpha risking his own life in the process. Thanks to Dredd, the Search/Destroy Agency is able to lock onto Alpha's location and transmit him back home before he's killed. Dredd also makes contact with Hondo City, letting them know he's alive.

Judgement Day left three billion people dead worldwide. Two billion of these were killed in the five mega-cities that were overrun and thus destroyed by nuclear strikes. The remaining one billion were killed in all the other cities across the world, including many Judges defending their cities. The heavy death toll on Justice Departments worldwide would have effects in later stories.

With every Judge focused on the external threat, crime lords and gangs had seized control over parts of the city, such as Sector 123, and mutants gangs made constant raids due to the gaping holes in the city's walls. The initial aftermath would involve regaining control of the lost sectors and constantly fending off mutant assaults. As a result of Sabbat's actions, there would be occasional spontaneous zombie risings for a while after.

The loss of Judge life - coming so soon after Necropolis - led to problems across the southern sectors, declining morale, and cadet Judges being rushed onto the streets. McGruder would respond to this with the Mechanismo project: robot Judges. Other Mega-Cities would stop sending Judges to Luna-1, which caused the colony's Judge force to suffer as a result.

Mega-City Two lay in ruins, with mutant gangs fighting for dominance and a scant few Judges surviving in underground bunkers. In 2133, Judge Dredd would go there to prevent a unified mutant army from gaining Justice Department technology.

"The Americans" revealed that Mega-City One's Psi Division had gleaned knowledge of the 2150 nuclear world war from Johnny Alpha's mind, recording this data in the "Alpha File." The information was kept hidden from Brit-Cit.

Hondo City began rebuilding Mega-City Two (calling it the Hondo cluster) so as to move many of their citizens over there. This rebuild was later abandoned by the Hondo judges after a series of strange murders and disappearances, as well as the population being unhappy at being moved thousands of miles away from friends and family.

Thirty years after the original story, some non-canonical stories with characters from various series in 2000 AD and the Judge Dredd Megazine told another version of "Judgement Day" in which the entire multiverse was infested with zombies and many major characters, including Dredd, became undead. These stories are due to be collected in a trade paperback called The Darkest Judge.

Publication

It ran in both magazines:

Judgement Day (all written by Garth Ennis)):
 "Judgement Day" (with Peter Doherty (1, 2, 10, 11 and 19) and Carlos Ezquerra (4, 5, 7, 8, 13, 14, 16, 17 and 20), in 2000 AD #786-799, 1992)
 "Judgement Day" (with Dean Ormston (1-3 and 5-6) and Chris Halls (4), in Judge Dredd Megazine #2.04-2.09, 1992)

Collected editions
It has been collected by three different publishers:

Judge Dredd: Judgement Day:
 Hamlyn, 1999, 
 DC/Rebellion Developments, 2004,  (also collects "The Kinda Dead Man" from prog 816)
Judge Dredd: The Complete Case Files 17, Rebellion, 2011, 
 Judge Dredd: The Mega Collection no. 37, Hachette Partworks, 2015
 Contains two other stories.

See also
2000 AD crossovers

References

External links
2000 AD's Judge Dredd timeline entry
Review of Judgement Day trade paperback